Alan Gonzalo Varela (born 4 July 2001) is an Argentine professional footballer who plays as a central midfielder for Boca Juniors.

Club career
Varela joined Boca Juniors in 2012 from Barcelona Luján; a subsidiary of Barcelona, who later became known as Barcelona Juniors following a partnership with Boca. After training with Boca's senior side during 2019, a year that also saw him sign his first professional contract, Varela made the breakthrough into Miguel Ángel Russo's first-team in 2020. He was an unused substitute seven times in all competitions between September and December, including for the first time on 17 September for a Copa Libertadores win over Libertad. Varela's senior debut came on 20 December in a Copa de la Liga Profesional game with Independiente.

International career
In 2019, Varela was selected by Argentina U18 manager Esteban Solari for the COTIF Tournament in Spain.

Career statistics
.

Honours
Boca Juniors
 Primera División: 2022
 Copa Argentina: 2019–20
 Copa de la Liga Profesional: 2020, 2022
 Supercopa Argentina: 2022

Notes

References

External links

2001 births
Living people
People from La Matanza Partido
Argentine footballers
Argentina youth international footballers
Association football midfielders
Argentine Primera División players
Boca Juniors footballers
Sportspeople from Buenos Aires Province